Zutshi is a Kashmiri Pandit clan and surname, originating from the Kashmir Valley of Jammu and Kashmir, India.

Notable people with the surname include:

Geeta Zutshi (born 1956), Indian athlete
Prithvi Zutshi, Indian actor
Rajendranath Zutshi (born 1961), Indian actor
Mohan Lal Kashmiri (1812-1877), Indian traveler

References

Surnames
Indian surnames
Hindu surnames
Kashmiri tribes
Kashmiri-language surnames